Tessa de Kom (born November 4, 2000) is a Dutch kickboxer, currently signed to Glory. She is the current Enfusion Women's Strawweight (-52 kg) champion. As of January 2023, she is ranked as the ninth-best female pound for pound kickboxer in the world by Combat Press.

Kickboxing career
De Kom made her promotional debut with Enfusion against Rebecca Garside at Enfusion Cage Events 6 on September 3, 2022. She won the fight by unanimous decision. This victory earned her the chance to face Suhailey Albertus for the vacant Enfusion Women's Strawweight (-52 kg) title at Enfusion 110 on September 17, 2022. She captured the vacant belt by unanimous decision.

De Kom signed with Glory following this victory and made her debut with the promotion against the one-time Glory Women's Super Bantamweight title challenger Manazo Kobayashi at Glory Rivals 4 on December 25, 2022. She knocked Kobayashi down once in the first round, en-route to winning the fight by unanimous decision.

De Kom faced promotional newcomer Giuliana Cosnard at Glory Rivals 5 on January 28, 2023. De Kom stepped in as a replacement for Sarah Moussadak, who withdrew with an injury.

De Kom is expected to challenge Manazo Kobayashi for the RISE Women's Flyweight (-51 kg) title at RISE 168 on May 28, 2023.

Championships and accomplishments
International Federation of Muaythai Associations
 2022 IFMA European U23 Championships (-54 kg) 
Enfusion
Enfusion Women's Strawweight (-52 kg) Championship

Fight record

|-  style="background:#"
| 2023-05-28 || ||align=left| Manazo Kobayashi || RISE 168 || Tokyo, Japan || ||  || 
|-
! style=background:white colspan=9 |
|-
|-  style="background:#fbb"
| 2023-01-28 || Loss ||align=left| Giuliana Cosnard || Glory Rivals 5 || Tulum, Mexico ||Decision (Unanimous) || 3 || 3:00
|-
|-  style="background:#cfc"
| 2022-12-25 || Win ||align=left| Manazo Kobayashi || Glory Rivals 4 || Tokyo, Japan || Decision (Unanimous) || 3 || 3:00 
|-
|-  style="background:#cfc"
| 2022-09-17 || Win ||align=left| Suhailey Albertus || Enfusion 110 || Alkmaar, Netherlands || Decision (Unanimous) || 5 || 2:00 
|-
! style=background:white colspan=9 |
|-
|-  style="background:#cfc"
| 2022-09-03 || Win ||align=left| Milena Belimov || Enfusion Darmstadt|| Darmstadt, Germany || Decision (Unanimous) || 3 || 3:00 
|-
|-  style="background:#cfc"
| 2022-09-03 || Win ||align=left| Montana Aerts|| WFL || Almere, Netherlands || Decision (Unanimous) || 3 || 3:00 
|-
|-  style="background:#cfc"
| 2022-09-03 || Win ||align=left| Rebecca Garside || Enfusion Cage Events 6 || Alkmaar, Netherlands || Decision (Unanimous) || 3 || 3:00 
|-
| colspan=9 | Legend:    

|- style="background:#fbb;"
| 2022-02-14 || Loss ||align=left| Ezgi Keles || 2022 IFMA European U23 Championships, Tournament Final || Istanbul, Turkey || Decision (Unanimous) || 3 || 2:00
|-
! style=background:white colspan=9 |
|-
|- style="background:#cfc;"
| 2022-02-12 || Win ||align=left| Moa Carlsson || 2022 IFMA European U23 Championships, Tournament Semifinal || Istanbul, Turkey || Decision (Unanimous) || 3 || 2:00
|-
|- style="background:#cfc;"
| 2019-11-02 || Win ||align=left| Bibi van Santen || Tribe Events || Netherlands || Decision (Unanimous) || 3 || 1:30
|-
|- style="background:#fbb;"
| 2018-05-06 || Loss ||align=left| Jody Munja || Ypenburg Fightday 13 Exclusive || The Hague, Netherlands || Decision (Unanimous) || 3 || 1:30
|-
|- style="background:#cfc;"
| 2018-04-01 || Win ||align=left| Giulia Klamer || Power Women By Dodi || Amsterdam, Netherlands || Decision (Unanimous) || 3 || 1:30
|-
| colspan=9 | Legend:

See also
 List of current GLORY fighters
 List of female kickboxers

References

Living people
2000 births
Dutch female kickboxers
Sportspeople from Maassluis
21st-century Dutch people